The Story of ... Demis Roussos is a double LP by Greek singer Demis Roussos, released in 1987 on the label .

Commercial performance 
The album reached no. 16 in the Netherlands.

Background 
All the songs on the album were Demis Roussos's old songs (including some that he had sung as a vocalist with the band Aphrodite's Child).

The first 8 tracks (the whole side 1 and tracks 1–3 on side 2) were recorded live during "Goud van Oud Live" on April 10, 1987 in Rosmalen.

All the tracks on side 3 were new studio re-recordings of old Aphrodite Child's hits.

Another 7 tracks (tracks 4–5 on side 2 and the whole side 4) were from the Demis Roussos's 1986 album . (As was the case with The Story of Demis Roussos, the album Greater Love was released on the label BR Music.)

The album The Story of Demis Roussos spanned three singles in 1987: "Rain and Tears" (a live recording from the above-mentioned concert in Rosmalen, Holland), "Marie Jolie", and "It's Five O'Clock". All the three were covers of Aphrodite's Child hits from the time Roussos was in the band.

Track listing 
The first three sides were produced by Ed Starink and Bert van Breda, except "Follow Me" produced by Raphael Preston & SP '86 and "Summerwine" produced by Ad Bowman for Nederland Muziekland.

The fourth side was produced by Raphael Preston and SP '86 for V2 Productions, except "Island of Love" produced by Tony Violaris.

Produced by Ed Starink and Bert van Breda. Arranged by Ed Starink. Engineered by Sander Bos.
****' Produced by Tony Violaris
* Produced by Ad Bowman for Nederland Muziekland
** Produced by Raphael Preston and SP '86 for V2 Productions
*** Recorded live in Rosmalen (Holland) during "Goud van Oud Live" on April 10, 1987

Charts

Certifications

References

External links 
 Demis Roussos – The Story of Demis Roussos at Discogs

1987 albums
Demis Roussos albums
BR Music albums
Albums produced by Ed Starink